Vete Sakaio OBE is a Tuvaluan politician.

A civil engineer by trade, he was described in 2008 as a "leader of the community" on his home island of Niutao. He is also the Vice President of the Tuvalu Association of Sports and National Olympic Committee, and a leading member of the Tuvalu Amateur Sports Association.

In 2010, he went into politics, standing for Parliament in the general election. He was elected MP for Niutao. Following the election, he was appointed as Minister for Works and Natural Resources in Prime Minister Maatia Toafa's Cabinet. He lost office just three months later, when Toafa's government was brought down by a motion of no confidence.

Vete Sakaio was appointed Deputy Prime Minister and Minister for Public Utilities on 5 August 2013 following Enele Sopoaga becoming prime minister.

On 28 September 2013, Vete Sakaio concluded his speech to the General Debate of the 68th Session of the United Nations General Assembly with an appeal to the world, "please save Tuvalu against climate change. Save Tuvalu in order to save yourself, the world".

In the 2015 New Year Honours, Sakaio was made an Officer of the Order of the British Empire.

Vete Sakaio was not re-elected in the 2015 Tuvaluan general election.

External links
 (28 Sep 2013) Address by His Excellency Vete Palakua Sakaio, Deputy Prime Minister of Tuvalu at the general debate of the 68th Session of the General Assembly of the United Nations

References

Deputy Prime Ministers of Tuvalu
Government ministers of Tuvalu
Members of the Parliament of Tuvalu
Members of the Order of the British Empire
People from Niutao
Living people
Year of birth missing (living people)